Matías Franco Descotte (born 29 August 1994) is an Argentine tennis player.

Descotte has a career high ATP singles ranking of 285 achieved on 12 August 2019. He also has a career high doubles ranking of 252 achieved on 29 July 2019.

Descotte has won 1 ATP Challenger singles title at the 2019 Morelos Open.

Challenger and Futures finals

Singles: 17 (8–9)

Doubles: 22 (9–13)

References

External links
 
 

1994 births
Living people
Argentine male tennis players
Tennis players from Buenos Aires
21st-century Argentine people